DLO can refer to:

 D'Lo Brown, ring name of American wrestler Ace Conner
 D'Lo, Sri Lankan-American writer
Dead letter office, part of a postal office
Defence Logistics Organisation of the UK military
 IATA location identifier for Delano Municipal Airport, California, US
Dense linear order, in mathematical order theory
 Direct labour organisation of a UK local authority
 Discontinuity layout optimization, an engineering analysis procedure
 Nickname of D'Angelo Russell, an American basketball player
 dLocal, a Uruguayan technology company